"The Sky's the Limit" is an episode of the BBC sit-com Only Fools and Horses. It was the first episode of series 7, and first broadcast on 30 December 1990. In the episode, Del acquires a satellite dish for Boycie, unaware that it has been stolen from Gatwick Airport.

Synopsis
As Uncle Albert prepares breakfast, Del Boy informs him that Raquel is now sleeping with him instead of in Rodney's bedroom. Rodney has been drinking heavily since he was thrown out of his flat by Cassandra, who has gone on holiday to Spain with her mother Pam. As Del and Raquel leave, Rodney enters hungover and asks Albert to phone his work and tell them he will be off sick.

Later, at Boycie's house, he has managed to get a new satellite dish installed. That night, at the Nag's Head, as Albert sings and plays "Red Sails in the Sunset" on the piano, Del enters, shortly followed by Cassandra's father Alan. They chat about how Rodney's drinking problem is ruining his life. Alan then mentions that when he retires and settles into his villa with Pam, he would like to leave his business to Rodney and Cassandra. Del then gets a phone call from Boycie's brother-in-law Bronco.

The next day, Boycie tells Del that someone stole his satellite dish, and as it was reported seen on the estate, asks Del to buy it back if offered it. Del follows Rodney to the balcony, and Rodney says that he will stop criticising Cassandra's promotion at her bank, as he wants their marriage to repair. Del suggests that when Cassandra lands, Rodney take her to the bridal suite of a plush hotel near the airport. Rodney agrees to this idea. Del then points out a satellite dish installed on the balcony, which he got from Bronco and is intending to sell back to Boycie. That night, Rodney is certain that he and Cassandra will reconcile. But when he gets to Gatwick Airport, he finds out that Cassandra's plane has been rerouted and she has landed in Manchester.

Boycie later tells Del that his satellite dish was not stolen, it was just taken away to be repaired, meaning the dish Del acquired was not Boycie's. Del phones Bronco, finding out that the dish was stolen from Gatwick Airport's main runway, causing chaos throughout Europe including Cassandra's diversion to Manchester. Del and Rodney head for the balcony, and as they do so, the dish switches on and a large aeroplane flies towards Nelson Mandela House. The episode ends with the Trotter Brothers holding each other shouting, "Switch it off!"

Episode cast

Production 
The final scene of the plane heading towards the flats meant that the episode was temporarily removed from repeat airings following the September 11 attacks.

From this episode onwards, Trigger appears in every remaining episode of the show.

Episode concept 
The idea for the script was based on John Sullivan's holiday to Portugal, and discovering that he was not booked on the plane.

References

External links

1990 British television episodes
Only Fools and Horses (series 7) episodes